Rachid Bladehane (born 28 July 1957) was the Algerian Secretary of State for National Community and Experts Abroad. He was appointed as secretary on 2 January 2020 and succeeded by Samir Chaabna in June 2020.

Education 
Bladehane holds a PhD from the École nationale d'administration.

References 

Living people
1957 births

21st-century Algerian politicians
Algerian politicians

École nationale d'administration alumni